Pendleton Township is an inactive township in St. Francois County, in the U.S. state of Missouri.

Pendleton Township was erected in 1821.

References

Townships in Missouri
Townships in St. Francois County, Missouri